The Second Political Statute of the Province of Costa Rica was issued on May 16, 1823 by the interim government and the Second Provincial Congress of the Province of Costa Rica.  It was issued just after the Ochomogo War when the monarchist camp settled in Cartago and Heredia and headed by Joaquín de Oreamuno as its commander of arms, was defeated by the Republican side commanded by Gregorio José Ramírez and gravitated around San José and Alajuela.

Ramírez defeated Oreamuno on April 5 at the battle of Ochomogo and assumed power until April 16 when he handed it over to a Constituent Congress that held it between April 16 and May 10, 1823, presided over by José María de Peralta y La Vega. This Congress confirmed Ramírez as General Commander in Arms, imposed the seat of government in San José and promulgated the Second Political Statute of the Province that it officiated as a Constitution. This Statute created a Governmental Superior Junta of five tenure and two alternates members and prescribed a bicameral Parliament that appointed a Political Chief, a Mayor and a General Commander of Arms. The two chambers of Parliament were an Assembly of Representatives and a Representative Council both of popular election. The first had initiative of law, fiscal authority and construction of infrastructure, the second functioned as a high chamber with power of sanction of laws, would advise the Executive Branch, commission of appointments and court of ethics for the civil servants.

The statute would remain in force from May 1823 to November 1824, when the Basis of Federal Constitution would become effective as Costa Rica is a member of the Central American Federation.

References

Constitutions of Costa Rica